Kyger is an unincorporated community in Gallia County, in the U.S. state of Ohio.

History
Kyger was platted in 1842. The community took its name from nearby Kyger Creek.  A post office called Kyger was established in 1837, and remained in operation until 1962.

References

Unincorporated communities in Gallia County, Ohio
Unincorporated communities in Ohio